Morrison & Foerster LLP (also known as MoFo) is an American multinational law firm headquartered in San Francisco, California, with 17 offices located throughout the United States, Asia, and Europe. The firm has over 1,000 lawyers who advise clients across a range of industries and practices, including intellectual property, patent litigation, corporate/M&A, business restructuring, and securities.

History

In 1883, Alexander Francis Morrison (1856–1921), an alumnus of the University of California, Berkeley and Hastings College of the Law, founded the firm in San Francisco under the name O’Brien & Morrison. His aim was to practice "principally in the line of corporation business."

In 1891, Morrison formed a partnership with Constantine E.A. Foerster (1860–1898). Starting in the 1920s and 1930s, the firm developed a deep client roster, which brought stability to sustain the firm over the next three decades.

In the 1960s, a group of young partners—John Austin, Dick Archer, and Bob Raven—set out to reinvigorate the firm in response to stagnant revenue and changes in the business and social environment. The strategy, resulting from the so-called "Schroeder's meetings" because they were held at the San Francisco restaurant, included ideas for modernizing the practice of law. The partners replaced outmoded policies and insisted on budgets and operational plans. The firm started to recruit at law schools and began hiring women lawyers. In time, the firm rebuilt its litigation practice by training new associates on small bank cases.

In 1974, the firm expanded outside San Francisco and opened an office in Los Angeles to better meet the needs of longtime client Crocker National Bank.

Soon after, the firm expanded again, opening an office in Washington, D.C. in 1979 and its first non-U.S. office in London in 1980.

In 1987, the firm merged with New York-based litigation company Parker Auspitz and opened its Tokyo office.

The firm merged again in 1991, this time with Ciotti & Murashige. A decade later, Morrison & Foerster became one of the largest international law firms in Tokyo when it merged with Ito & Mitomi.

In 2003, Morrison & Foerster received their first 100% rating on HRC's Corporate Equality Index indicating they met all 7 of that year's criteria for having a positive record "toward lesbian, gay, bisexual and transgender employees, consumers and investors".

In November 2013, the firm expanded its European presence by opening an office in Berlin. The following month, the German team advised Axel Springer, one of Europe's largest media companies, on its acquisition of N24 Media, Germany's largest independent producers of information.

In 2022, Morrison & Foerster was a founding member of the Legal Alliance for Reproductive Rights, a coalition of United States law firms offering free legal services to people seeking and providing abortions in the wake of Dobbs v. Jackson Women's Health Organization, which overruled Roe v. Wade.

Clients

The firm was the lead bankruptcy counsel to Residential Capital. ResCap). and secured their chapter 11 plan.

In July 2013, Morrison & Foerster represented SoftBank in its $21.6 billion acquisition of a 78 percent stake in Sprint Nextel. According to The Wall Street Journal, the transaction was "one of the most complex and unusual deals in the annals of takeovers." The firm also represented SoftBank in Alibaba's U.S. IPO—the largest IPO in history.

Morrison & Foerster Foundation

Formed in 1986, the Morrison & Foerster Foundation is a charitable foundation funded mainly by the firm's partners. In total, the Foundation has donated $44 million to nonprofit organizations since its inception.

In 2015, Law360 recognized Morrison & Foerster as one of the 10 Most Charitable Law Firms.

Offices

Noted professionals

 Beth Brinkmann, former assistant to the solicitor general of the U.S. from 1993 until 2001, and who served as a partner until 2009.
 Drew S. Days, III, who served as the United States Solicitor General from 1993 to 1996, and who served as of counsel until 2011.
 LaShann M. DeArcy, judge of the United States District Court for the Eastern District of New York since 2015
 Ketanji Brown Jackson, Current Justice for the Supreme Court of the United States. Formally judge for the United States District Court for the District of Columbia from 2013 to 2021, former commissioner on the U.S. Sentencing Commission, who served as of counsel until 2013. 
 Justin Fairfax, who is the lieutenant governor of the U.S. state of Virginia.
 Paul Goldstein, Stanford Law School professor and an expert on intellectual property law, currently serves as of counsel. 
 Shirley Hufstedler, first U.S. Secretary of Education from 1979 to 1981, who was of counsel.
 Tony West, former acting United States Associate Attorney General, who served as a partner until 2009.

References

External links
 
 

Law firms established in 1883
1883 establishments in California
Law firms based in San Francisco
Foreign law firms with offices in Hong Kong
Foreign law firms with offices in Japan